The 1976 Texas Longhorns football team represented the University of Texas during the 1976 NCAA Division I football season.  It was Darrell Royal's final year as head coach.

Schedule

Personnel

Season summary

Boston College

North Texas State

at Rice

vs Oklahoma

President Gerald Ford walked out with both coaches to midfield for the pregame coin toss

SMU

at Texas Tech

Houston

at TCU

at Baylor

Texas A&M

Arkansas

Darrell Royal's final game as head coach

References

Texas
Texas Longhorns football seasons
Texas Longhorns football